Un Mundo Diferente (English: "A Different World") is the fifth studio album by Argentine singer-songwriter Diego Torres, it was released on October 31, 2001 through Sony Latin.

Album information 
Mostly comprises different traditional Latin rhythms in a contemporary style. Co-produced by Kike Santander and Cachorro López, this 13-track album was recorded in Buenos Aires, Madrid, Miami, and Milan. The album is considered as one of his best-selling album in his native Argentina.

It was preceded by the title single "Color Esperanza" a song composed by himself alongside Cachorro López and Coti Sorokin, also is considered as an anthem of hope due to the content of the lyrics. The song became his most popular song since was performed specially for Juan Pablo II. The album had two other singles "Sueños" and "Que No Me Pierda".

Track listing

Sales and certifications

See also 
 List of best-selling albums in Argentina

References

External links 
 

2001 albums
2002 albums
Diego Torres albums
Spanish-language albums
Sony Music Latin albums
Albums produced by Cachorro López